Ajoritsedere (Dere) Josephine Awosika is a Nigerian businesswoman who is chairwoman of Access Bank plc.  Prior to this appointment, she was Permanent Secretary in the Federal Ministries of Internal Affairs, Science & Technology and Power at different periods.

Awosika was born in Sapele, the sixth child of the first Nigerian Minister for Finance in the first republic Festus Okotie-Eboh, who was assassinated in 1966. She is a fellow of the Pharmaceutical Society of Nigeria and the West African Postgraduate College of Pharmacy.  She is an alumna of the University of Bradford, where she holds a Doctorate in Pharmaceutical Technology.

References

1950s births
Living people
Nigerian bankers
Nigerian women in business